The men's long jump at the 2016 IAAF World Indoor Championships took place on March 20, 2016.

The first round leader was Rushwal Samaai with an 8.14. He improved that on his second jump to a National Record equalling 8.18. Neither improved after that. In the third round, Fabrice Lapierre jumped a continental record 8.25 to break up the duo, his 8.25 just 1 cm behind Dendy. Huang Changzhou also equalled Henderson with a personal best 8.19, but Henderson held the tiebreaker. Over the next two round, Henderson improved his tiebreaker advantage but could not improve his best. On his final jump, Huang improved his personal best again to 8.21 to take the bronze medal. The top 5 competitors were only separated by 8 cm. So close was the competition, minus their best jumps, Dendy would have finished in 5th position and Lapierre 11th, not even making the final.

Results
The final was started at 13:05.

References

Long jump
Long jump at the World Athletics Indoor Championships